The 2023 Sentinel Storage Alberta Scotties Tournament of Hearts, the provincial women's curling championship for Alberta, was held from January 18 to 22 at the Wetaskiwin Civic Centre Twin Arena in Wetaskiwin, Alberta. The winning Kayla Skrlik rink from Calgary represented Alberta at the 2023 Scotties Tournament of Hearts in Kamloops, British Columbia, and finished sixth in Pool A with a 4–4 record.

In the final against Lethbridge's Casey Scheidegger, Skrlik won the game on her last shot, a "come-around double takeout" to score two points, resulting in a jubilant celebration that went viral in the curling world. Skrlik's rink won all eight of their games in the tournament. 

Despite losing in the final, the Scheidegger rink still qualified for the Scotties as the Wild Card #2 representative based on CTRS standings, which they finished sixth in Pool B with a 3–5 record.

Qualification process

Teams
The teams are listed as follows:

Round-robin standings
Final round-robin standings

Round-robin results
All draw times are listed in Mountain Time (UTC-07:00).

Draw 1
Wednesday, January 18, 10:00 am

Draw 2
Wednesday, January 18, 6:30 pm

Draw 3
Thursday, January 19, 10:00 am

Draw 4
Thursday, January 19, 6:30 pm

Draw 5
Friday, January 20, 10:00 am

Draw 6
Friday, January 20, 4:00 pm

Draw 7
Saturday, January 21, 10:00 am

Playoffs

Semifinal
Saturday, January 21, 6:30 pm

Final
Sunday, January 22, 10:00 am

Notelist

References

2023 in Alberta
Curling in Alberta
2023 Scotties Tournament of Hearts
January 2023 sports events in Canada
Wetaskiwin